Pasand Apni Apni is a 1983 Indian Hindi-language film directed by Basu Chatterjee, starring Ashok Kumar, Mithun Chakraborty, Rati Agnihotri, Utpal Dutt. The concept of this movie is based on the 1951 British film Happy Go Lovely, which was earlier used in the 1969 movie Sajan and subsequently in Ghajini.

Plot
An insane misunderstanding that leads to love. Here, an almost-out-of-work actress - Geeta  - accepts a ride from the chauffeur of wealthy industrialist Sandeep Anand. She is seen descending from Sandeep's limo and assumed to be his fiancé, all unbeknownst to herself. As a result, wonderful things begin to happen to her - her theatre company makes her the leading lady of all their productions, she is courted and fêted wherever she goes and a journalist becomes her constant shadow. She finds herself falling for him only to find out that he is none other than Sandeep Anand.

Cast
Ashok Kumar as Shantilal Anand
Mithun Chakraborty as Sandeep Anand
Rati Agnihotri as Geeta
Utpal Dutt as Sriram Chaudhary
Subiraj as Tailor master Ismail
Javed Khan as Maruti
Jayshree T. as Former main dancer
Atul Agnihotri as Anil

Soundtrack
The music of the film was composed by Bappi Lahiri, while lyrics were penned by Yogesh.

External links

Pasand Apni Apni on The A.V. Club
Pasand Apni Apni on TV Guide
Pasand Apni Apni on Nowrunning.com

1980s Hindi-language films
Films directed by Basu Chatterjee
Films scored by Bappi Lahiri
Indian remakes of American films